Norharmine is an alkaloid of the beta-carboline class.

References

Beta-Carbolines
Methoxy compounds